A referendum on the enrichment of the National Charter (first approved in a 1976 referendum) was held in Algeria on 16 January 1986. The changes were approved by 98.3% of voters with a turnout of 95.9%.

Results

References

Referendums in Algeria
1986 in Algeria
1986 referendums